Vladislavs Soloveičiks (born 25 May 1999) is a Latvian football player who plays for FK Jelgava.

Club career
He made his debut in the Russian Football National League for FC Zenit-2 Saint Petersburg on 24 September 2017 in a game against FC Olimpiyets Nizhny Novgorod.

References

External links
 Profile by Russian Football National League
 

1999 births
Footballers from Riga
Living people
Skonto FC players
FC Zenit-2 Saint Petersburg players
Valmieras FK players
Latvian Higher League players
Latvian footballers
Latvia youth international footballers
Latvian expatriate footballers
Expatriate footballers in Russia
Latvian people of Russian descent
Association football midfielders
FC Kolos Kovalivka players
Ukrainian Premier League players
Expatriate footballers in Ukraine
Latvian expatriate sportspeople in Ukraine
FK Jelgava players